Gogglebox Australia is an Australian reality/observational television series on Network Ten and The LifeStyle Channel that premiered on 11 February 2015. The series, which is a local adaptation of the British series of the same name, sees Australian families, couples and friends watching and commenting on a variety of television programs and movies. The series airs on subscription television channel Lifestyle first, and then airs on free-to-air network Network Ten a day later.

The fifteenth season premiered on Lifestyle on 9 March 2022, following the airing of a celebrity special on 2 March 2022.

Series overview

Episodes

Season 1 (2015)

Season 2 (2015)

Season 3 (2016)

Season 4 (2016)

Season 5 (2017)

Season 6 (2017)

Season 7 (2018)

Season 8 (2018)

Season 9 (2019)

Season 10 (2019)

Season 11 (2020)

Season 12 (2020)

Season 13 (2021)

Season 14 (2021)

Season 15 (2022)

Season 16 (2022)

Season 17 (2023)

References

Lists of Australian non-fiction television series episodes